The Rural Municipality of Estevan No. 5 is a rural municipality (RM) in the Canadian province of Saskatchewan within Census Division No. 1 and  Division No. 1. Located in the southeast portion of the province, it surrounds the City of Estevan. The RM is adjacent to the United States border, neighbouring Divide County and Burke County in North Dakota.

History 
The RM of Estevan No. 5 incorporated as a rural municipality on December 12, 1910.

Geography

Communities and localities 
The following urban municipalities are surrounded by the RM.

Cities
Estevan

Towns
Bienfait

Villages
Roche Percée

Parks and recreation 
The following parks are within the RM:
Woodlawn Regional Park

Demographics 

Government 
The RM of Estevan No. 5 is governed by an elected municipal council and an appointed administrator that meets on the second and fourth Wednesday of every month. The reeve of the RM is Terry Keating, while its administrator is Loran Tessier. The RM's office is located in Minton.

See also 
List of rural municipalities in Saskatchewan

References

External links 

E

Division No. 1, Saskatchewan